Beauty in Chains is a 1918 American silent drama film directed by Elsie Jane Wilson based on the novel Doña Perfecta by Benito Pérez Galdós. The film stars Ella Hall and Emory Johnson. The photoplay was released on March 11, 1918, by the Universal Film Manufacturing Company.

Cast
{| 
! style="width: 180px; text-align: left;" |  Actor
! style="width: 230px; text-align: left;" |  Role
|- style="text-align: left;"
|Ella Hall||Rosarita
|-
|Emory Johnson||Pepe Rey Don Jose
|-
|Ruby Lafayette||Doña Perfecta
|-
|Winter Hall||Don Cayetano
|-
|Gretchen Lederer||Juana Toya
|-
|Harry Holden||Licurgo
|-
|Maxfield Stanley||Jacinto
|-
|George A. McDaniel||Caballuco
|-
|William Hakeem||Lt. Pinzon
|-
|}

Preservation
With no copies of Beauty in Chains listed in any film archives, it is a lost film.

References

External links

American silent feature films
American black-and-white films
Silent American drama films
Films directed by Elsie Jane Wilson
1910s American films
1910s English-language films